Patriots were colonists of the Thirteen Colonies who rejected British rule during the American Revolution. Most of the individuals listed below served it in multiple capacities.

Statesmen and office holders 
John Adams (1735–1826), American statesman, Founding Father and leader of the American Revolution who served as the second president of the United States from 1797 to 1801
John Dickinson
Benjamin Franklin
Alexander Hamilton
John Hancock
John Jay
Thomas Jefferson
Benjamin Kent
Richard Henry Lee
James Madison
William Paca
Jonathan Shipley

Businessmen and writers 
Samuel Adams

John Ames

Alexander Hamilton

Patrick Henry

Timothy Matlack

Philip Mazzei

William Molineux

James Otis Jr.

Thomas Paine

Molly Pitcher

Samuel Prescott

Paul Revere

Roger Sherman

Elkanah Watson

Ethan Allen

Military officers 

Arthur St. Clair, Major General and 9th President of the Continental Congress
Benjamin Loxley
Nathanael Greene
Nathan Hale
Elijah Isaacs
John Paul Jones
Charles Lee
Francis Marion
Daniel Morgan
Andrew Pickens
John Parker
Israel Putnam
Daniel Shays
Thomas Sumter
James Mitchell Varnum
Joseph Bradley Varnum
Francis Vigo
Friedrich Wilhelm von Steuben
George Washington
Anthony Wayne
John Gano, Brigade Chaplain and friend of George Washington

African-American Patriots 

Crispus Attucks
William Flora
James Armistead Lafayette
Saul Matthews
Salem Poor
Peter Salem
Jack Sisson
Prince Whipple

References

Patriots in the American Revolution